The Order of Miloš Obilić is an Order of the Republic of Srpska. It is established in 1993 by the Constitution of Republika Srpska and 'Law on orders and awards' valid since 28 April 1993.

This order is awarded to the members of the Army of Republika Srpska who during the battle showed exceptional personal bravery during battle or who showed exceptional bravery in military matters. It is also awarded to non-military people who showed exceptional personal bravery in dangerous situations saving human lives and material goods.

It is named after Miloš Obilić.

See also 
 Miloš Obilić
 Orders, decorations and medals of Republika Srpska

References

External links 
 Law on orders and awards on Serbian language

Orders, decorations, and medals of Republic of Srpska
Awards established in 1993